The Tyrrhenian wall lizard (Podarcis tiliguerta) is a species of lizard in the family Lacertidae. The species is endemic to the islands Sardinia and Corsica.

Habitat
The natural habitats of P. tiliguerta are temperate forests, temperate shrubland, Mediterranean-type shrubby vegetation, temperate grassland, rocky areas, sandy shores, arable land, pastureland, and rural gardens.

Conservation status
P. tiliguerta is not considered a threatened species by the IUCN.

Subspecies
Ten subspecies are recognized as being valid, including the nominotypical subspecies.
Podarcis tiliguerta contii 
Podarcis tiliguerta eiselti 
Podarcis tiliguerta granchii 
Podarcis tiliguerta grandisonae 
Podarcis tiliguerta maresi 
Podarcis tiliguerta pardii 
Podarcis tiliguerta ranzii 
Podarcis tiliguerta rudolphisimonii 
Podarcis tiliguerta tiliguerta 
Podarcis tiliguerta toro 

Nota bene: A trinomial authority in parentheses indicates that the subspecies was originally described in a genus other than Podarcis.

Etymology
The subspecific name, granchii, is in honor of Italian herpetologist Edoardo Granchi of the Museo di Storia Naturale di Firenze.

References

External links

Podarcis
Fauna of Corsica
Fauna of Sardinia
Lizards of Europe
Reptiles described in 1789
Taxa named by Johann Friedrich Gmelin
Taxonomy articles created by Polbot